Hibbertia porongurupensis is a species of flowering plant in the family Dilleniaceae and is endemic to a restricted area of the south-west of Western Australia. It is a glabrous shrub with broadly elliptic to more or less round leaves and yellow flowers arranged singly in leaf axils with large numbers of stamens arranged around five carpels.

Description
There are many stamens and sometimes a few staminodes arranged in a ring around the five glabrous carpels, each with three to five ovules. Flowering occurs from September to October.

Taxonomy
Hibbertia porongurupensis was first formally described in 2000 by Judith R. Wheeler and Ruurd Dirk Hoogland in the journal Nuytsia from specimens collected by Hoogland at the base of the Devil's Slide in the Porongurup Range in 1971. The specific epithet (porongurupensis) refers to the type location.

Distribution and habitat
The hibbertia grows in rock crevices and on rock outcrops, restricted to the upper slopes of the Porongurup Range.

Conservation status
Hibbertia porongurupensis is classified as "Priority Four" by the Government of Western Australia Department of Parks and Wildlife, meaning that is rare or near threatened.

See also
List of Hibbertia species

References

porongurupensis
Flora of Western Australia
Plants described in 2000